Rushdi is a masculine Arabic given name, it may refer to:

Given name
Rushdy Abaza, Egyptian actor
Rushdi Said, Egyptian geologist
Rushdi al-Shawa, Palestinian politician
Ruzhdi Kerimov, Bulgarian footballer

Surname and family name
Ahmed Rushdi (politician), Egyptian politician
Ahmed Rushdi, Pakistani singer
Hasan Rushdy (born 1971), Sri Lankan cricketer
Hussein Rushdi Pasha, Egyptian politician
Mehmed Rushdi Pasha, Ottoman statesman
Natalie Rushdie, British jazz singer
Salman Rushdie, Indian-British novelist

See also
 Rüştü, Turkish form

Arabic-language surnames
Arabic masculine given names